Brockhampton may refer to:

Brockhampton (band), an American self-described "boy band" and music collective
Brockhampton, Gloucestershire, Cotswold, England
Brockhampton, Tewkesbury, a location in Gloucestershire, England
Brockhampton (near Bromyard), Herefordshire, England
Brockhampton (near Ross-on-Wye), Herefordshire, England

See also
Bockhampton (disambiguation)